Mario Čižmek  (born 23 December 1975 in Zagreb) is a Croatian retired footballer.

Club career
Čižmek previously played for NK Zagreb, NK Kamen Ingrad and NK Inter Zaprešić in the Croatian First League. He also had a spell in the Israeli Premier League with Hapoel Petah Tikva during the 2001-02 season and with KR Reykjavík in 2006.

References

1975 births
Living people
Footballers from Zagreb
Association football midfielders
Croatian footballers
Croatia youth international footballers
Croatia under-21 international footballers
NK Zagreb players
NK Brotnjo players
Hapoel Petah Tikva F.C. players
NK Kamen Ingrad players
NK Inter Zaprešić players
Knattspyrnufélag Reykjavíkur players
NK Croatia Sesvete players
Croatian Football League players
Premier League of Bosnia and Herzegovina players
Israeli Premier League players
Úrvalsdeild karla (football) players
Croatian expatriate footballers
Expatriate footballers in Bosnia and Herzegovina
Croatian expatriate sportspeople in Bosnia and Herzegovina
Expatriate footballers in Israel
Croatian expatriate sportspeople in Israel
Expatriate footballers in Iceland
Croatian expatriate sportspeople in Iceland